Alexis Nahuel Gómez (born 28 February 2000) is an Argentine professional footballer who plays as a forward for I-League club Sudeva Delhi.

Club career
Gómez signed his first professional contract with Estudiantes in late 2016. After making his debut in a 2–2 draw against Excursionistas, his performances garnered interest from top Argentinian sides River Plate, Boca Juniors and Independiente.

In 2023, Gómez moved to India and signed with Sudeva Delhi. He scored multiple goals for the club while they got relegated after end of the season.

Career statistics

Club

Notes

References

2000 births
Living people
Argentine footballers
Association football forwards
Primera B Metropolitana players
Primera Nacional players
Estudiantes de Buenos Aires footballers
Deportivo Riestra players
UAI Urquiza players